Glossop Castle (also known as Mouselow Castle) is a Norman earthwork north of Glossop, off Hilltop Road,  east of Manchester, on the A57. The site is visible from the main road, standing atop a commanding ridge.

History
The castle is a Norman earthwork motte-and-bailey fortress, founded by William Peverel. The Norman castle sits on an old Celtic hilltop site, possibly a hillfort. The earthworks have been damaged by quarrying and the position of the bailey has been lost. The site is a Scheduled Monument.

References

Castles in Derbyshire
Glossop
Motte-and-bailey castles
Scheduled monuments in Derbyshire